Jonesboro Historic District may refer to:

 Jonesboro Historic District (Jonesboro, Georgia), listed on the National Register of Historic Places (NRHP)
 Jonesboro Historic District (Morganton, North Carolina), listed on the NRHP in Burke County, North Carolina
 Jonesborough Historic District,  Jonesborough, Tennessee